Megacyllene is a genus of beetles in the family Cerambycidae, containing the following species:

 Megacyllene abnormis (Aurivillius, 1920)
 Megacyllene acuta (Germar, 1821)
 Megacyllene anacantha (Chevrolat, 1862)
 Megacyllene andesiana (Casey, 1912)
 Megacyllene angulata (Fabricius, 1775)
 Megacyllene angulifera (Casey, 1912)
 Megacyllene antennata (White, 1855)
 Megacyllene bonplandi (Gounelle, 1911)
 Megacyllene boryi (Laporte & Gory, 1835)
 Megacyllene caryae (Gahan, 1908)
 Megacyllene castanea (Laporte & Gory, 1835)
 Megacyllene castroi Prosen, 1947
 Megacyllene chalybeata (White, 1855)
 Megacyllene cleroides (Melzer, 1931)
 Megacyllene comanchei Rice & Morris, 1992
 Megacyllene congener (Laporte & Gory, 1835)
 Megacyllene costaricensis (Thomson, 1860)
 Megacyllene decora (Olivier, 1795)
 Megacyllene designata (Chevrolat, 1862)
 Megacyllene ebenina Monne & Napp, 2004
 Megacyllene ellifranziana (Fuchs, 1961)
 Megacyllene falsa (Chevrolat, 1862)
 Megacyllene gaucha Martins & Galileo, 2011
 Megacyllene globosa Aragao & Monne, 2011
 Megacyllene guarani Aragao & Monne, 2011
 Megacyllene hoffmanni (Laporte & Gory, 1835)
 Megacyllene horioni Tippmann, 1960
 Megacyllene insignita Perroud, 1855
 Megacyllene lanei (Tippmann, 1953)
 Megacyllene latreillei (Laporte & Gory, 1835)
 Megacyllene lutosa (LeConte, 1861)
 Megacyllene magna Di Iorio, 1997
 Megacyllene mellyi (Chevrolat, 1862)
 Megacyllene menalaspis (Chevrolat, 1862)
 Megacyllene multiguttata (Burmeister, 1865)
 Megacyllene murina (Burmeister, 1879)
 Megacyllene neblinosa Di Iorio, 1995
 Megacyllene nebulosa Laporte & Gory, 1835
 Megacyllene nevermanni Martins & Galileo, 2008
 Megacyllene panamensis (Bates, 1885)
 Megacyllene powersi Linsley & Chemsak, 1963
 Megacyllene proxima (Laporte & Gory, 1835)
 Megacyllene punensis Martins & Galileo, 2008
 Megacyllene quinquefasciata (Melzer, 1931)
 Megacyllene robiniae (Forster, 1771)
 Megacyllene robusta Linsley & Chemsak, 1963
 Megacyllene rotundicollis Zajciw, 1963
 Megacyllene rufofemorata Di Iorio, 1997
 Megacyllene sahlbergi (Aurivillius, 1913)
 Megacyllene snowi (Casey, 1912)
 Megacyllene spixii (Laporte & Gory, 1835)
 Megacyllene tafivallensis Di Iorio, 1998
 Megacyllene trifasciata Viana, 1994
 Megacyllene unicolor Fuchs, 1955
 Megacyllene unicoloricollis Fuchs, 1961

References

 
Cerambycidae genera